RKO Keith's Theater is a historic RKO Pictures movie theater located at 117-09 Hillside Avenue in the Richmond Hill section of the New York City borough of Queens.  It was designed by architect R. Thomas Short and built in 1929 in the Neo-Classical Revival style. It has a two-story, three bay wide front facade with its original, horizontal marquee and terra cotta details. The orchestra level measures 100 feet, 6 inches deep and 99 feet wide. It has a balcony and three tiered boxes of seating on the north and south walls.

The theater closed in 1968 and it has been used as a bingo hall and flea market. In 2003, the theater was listed on New York's State Register of Historic Places, but the property owner refused listing on the National Register of Historic Places.

References

External links
Cinema Treasures, RKO Keith's Theatre, Richmond Hill, NY
"Fears of coming detractions at former RKO Keith's in Richmond Hill," BY Nicholas Hirshon, New York Daily News, August 13th 2008

Neoclassical architecture in New York City
Theatres completed in 1929
Theatres in Queens, New York
Richmond Hill, Queens
Cinemas and movie theaters in New York City